Magnus Nilsson (born February 1, 1978) is a Swedish former professional ice hockey forward.

Playing career
Magnus Nilsson was selected on June 22, 1996, by the Detroit Red Wings as their fifth draft choice (144th overall). He was picked in the sixth round of the nine-round 1996 NHL Entry Draft. He played two seasons for Detroit’s ECHL affiliates before returning to Sweden.

Among the teams he represented are Finspångs AIK, Vita Hästen, Luleå, Malmö, Timrå and Hudiksvall.
He ended his career in 2016 and became coach of the Söderhamn/Ljusne HC.

Career statistics

References

External links

1978 births
Detroit Red Wings draft picks
Living people
Louisiana IceGators (ECHL) players
Luleå HF players
Malmö Redhawks players
Swedish ice hockey forwards
Timrå IK players
Toledo Storm players